Fishlake is a civil parish in the metropolitan borough of Doncaster, South Yorkshire, England.  The parish contains 13 listed buildings that are recorded in the National Heritage List for England.  Of these, one is listed at Grade I, the highest of the three grades, and the others are at Grade II, the lowest grade.  The parish contains the village of Fishlake and the surrounding area.  The listed buildings include a church, the remains of two medieval crosses, houses and cottages, a farmhouse, farm buildings, two former windmills, a road bridge, and a pinfold.


Key

Buildings

References

Citations

Sources

 

Lists of listed buildings in South Yorkshire
Buildings and structures in the Metropolitan Borough of Doncaster